Dr. Govindarajula Venkata Subba Rao (1895 – 29 October 1959) was a famous Telugu drama and film actor.

Life sketch
He played in the drama Merchant of Venice during the school days in Tenali. He portrayed Satyaki and Bheema in Gayopakhyanam as his debut performance during the convocation function. Subsequently, he acted many dramas in variety of characters. They include Hyderjung in Bobbili, Lubdhavadhanlu in Kanyasulkam.

He has done L.M.P. in Madras. During this period he has acted in Prataparudreeyam written by Vedam Venkataraya Sastry. During one of their shows he impressed the author. He toured Andhra Pradesh and acted as Yugandhar which brought him laurels. Subsequently, he continues to act in dramas while practising medicine.

He entered Telugu films with Mala Pilla (1938) directed by Gudavalli Ramabrahmam as Sundararama Sastry. He played many Mythological, historical and social roles. He has distinct posture and gesture that are characteristic of this great acting genius. He portrayed Mayala Marathi in Bala Nagamma (1942), Brahma Naidu in Palnati Yudham, Shvaukaru Changaiah in Shavukaru and Lubdhavadhanulu in Kanyasulkam.

Filmography
 Malapilla (1938) as Sundara Rama Sastry (debut)
 Gruhalakshmi (1938)
 Bala Nagamma (1942) as  Mayala Marathi
 Mugguru Maratilu (1946) as Marathi ruler Siddhoji
 Palnati Yudham (1947) as Brahma Naidu
 Ratnamala (1947)
 Dharmangada (1949)
 Gunasundari Katha (1949) as King Ugrasena
 Shavukaru (1950) as  Shavukaru Changaiah
 Pelli Chesi Choodu (1952) as  NTR's father
 Kanyasulkam (1955) as Lubdhavadhanlu
 Charana Daasi (1956) as    Basavaiah
 Bhagya Rekha (1957) as Musalaiah
 Panduranga Mahatyam (1957)

References

External links
 

Male actors in Telugu cinema
Indian male film actors
1895 births
1959 deaths
Telugu male actors
20th-century Indian male actors
People from Guntur district
Male actors from Chennai
Male actors from Andhra Pradesh